Sarah Bird is an American novelist, screenwriter, and journalist.

Biography
She was born in 1949 in Ann Arbor, Michigan. Her father was an officer in the US Air Force, and her family (a "Catholic family of eight"), including her mother, Colista Bird, travelled with him around the US and the world during her childhood.  Sarah's mother recognized signs of her daughter's creative storytelling talent as young as kindergarten.

She attended the University of New Mexico, earning a BA there in 1973.  Moving to the University of Texas at Austin, she went on to receive an MA in journalism there in 1976.  She is married to George Jones, and has one son, Gabriel Bird-Jones, born in 1989.  The family lives in Austin, Texas.

During the mid-1980s, Bird was a founding contributing-editor to Austin's Third Coast Magazine, for which she wrote numerous feature and humor articles.

Bird's first published novel was Do Evil Cheerfully, a mystery (as Sarah McCabe Bird).

In 1986, her comic novel Alamo House was published based on her experience as a graduate student at the University of Texas.

She published five contemporary romance novels with Silhouette under the pseudonym "Tory Cates".

Bird wrote the screenplay for the movie Don't Tell Her It's Me (1990, starring Shelley Long and Steve Guttenberg), adapting the Boyfriend School novel.

The Boyfriend School and The Mommy Club, published by Ballantine in 1989 and 1991, respectively, were both humorous novels drawing on Bird's life experiences.  In addition to novels, Bird has written screenplays for television and magazine articles for national women's magazines.  She writes a column for Texas Monthly. Virgin of the Rodeo was published in 1999.

Bird was named Austin's best author in 2001 by the Austin Chronicle, the year she also published The Yokota Officers Club, a novel that draws on her experiences as military brat.  She has also written screenplays for the National Geographic Channel and Hallmark, as well as the CBS movie Yesterday's Children.

Another novel, The Flamenco Academy, came out in 2006. A new novel, How Perfect Is That, was published by Knopf in June 2008.

Bibliography

Novels
Do Evil Cheerfully, 1983 (as Sarah McCabe Bird)
Alamo House, 1986
The Boyfriend School, 1989, Doubleday
The Mommy Club, 1991
Virgin of the Rodeo, 1999
The Yokota Officers Club, 2001
The Flamenco Academy, 2006
How Perfect Is That, 2008
The Gap Year, 2011
Above the East China Sea, 2014
Daughter of a Daughter of a Queen, 2018
Last Dance on the Starlight Pier, 2022

Nonfiction
A Love Letter to Texas Women, 2016, University of Texas Press

References

External links

 Sarah Bird - and interview with author
 Military brat calls a truce
 Bird's Words

1949 births
Living people
20th-century American novelists
American women novelists
Novelists from Texas
University of New Mexico alumni
Moody College of Communication alumni
Screenwriters from Texas
21st-century American novelists
American women journalists
20th-century American women writers
21st-century American women writers
20th-century American non-fiction writers
21st-century American non-fiction writers